Blue Gator is the third album led by saxophonist Willis Jackson featuring organist Jack McDuff and guitarist Bill Jennings which was recorded in 1959 and 1960 and released on the Prestige label.

Track listing
All compositions by Willis Jackson except where noted.
 "Blue Gator" – 9:12
 "Try a Little Tenderness" (Jimmy Campbell, Reg Connelly, Harry Woods) – 5:57
 "Gator's Tail" – 3:39
 "This Nearly Was Mine" (Oscar Hammerstein II, Richard Rodgers) – 4:31
 "East Breeze" (Esmond Edwards) – 10:01
 "She's Funny That Way" (Neil Moret, Richard Whiting) – 5:10

Note
Recorded at Van Gelder Studio in Hackensack, New Jersey on May 25, 1959 (tracks 3 & 6), and at Van Gelder Studio in Englewood Cliffs, New Jersey on November 9, 1959 (track 5), February 26, 1960 (track 4) and August 16, 1960 (tracks 1 & 2)

Personnel
Willis Jackson – tenor saxophone
Jack McDuff – organ
Bill Jennings – guitar
Milt Hinton (track 4), Wendell Marshall (tracks 1, 2 & 5), Tommy Potter (tracks 3 & 6) – bass
Bill Elliot (tracks 1 & 2), Alvin Johnson (tracks 3-6) – drums
Buck Clarke – congas (track 4)

References

Willis Jackson (saxophonist) albums
1960 albums
Prestige Records albums
Albums recorded at Van Gelder Studio
Albums produced by Esmond Edwards